Cymbidium ensifolium, the four-season orchid, is a species of orchid, also known as the golden-thread orchid, spring orchid, burned-apex orchid and rock orchid. It has a number of different cultivars of interest to orchid collectors.

References 

ensifolium
Plants described in 1753
Taxa named by Carl Linnaeus